The 2017 Bolivarian Games, officially the XVIII Bolivarian Games, was an international multi-sport event that was held from 11–25 November 2017, in Santa Marta, Colombia.

Host city selection
Ciudad Bolivar (Venezuela) and Santa Marta (Colombia) were the cities which decided to bid for hosting the Games. However, only Santa Marta submitted the official candidacy and later selected by ODEBO to host the 2017 Bolivarian Games.

Mascot
The mascot for these games was Ajaytuké, a sea urchin. The reason behind the choice of the mascot by the organizer is to convey the message to protect the animal and coral reefs.

Sports
The game featured 469 events from 54 disciplines and 34 sports in this edition of Bolivarian Games.

 Aquatics
 
 
 
 
 
 
 
 
 
 
 
 
 
 
   BMX racing 
   Mountain biking 
   Road racing 
   Track cycling 
 
 
 
 
 
 
   Artistic gymnastics
   Rhythmic gymnastics
   Trampoline
 
 
 
 
 
 
 
 
 
 
 
 
 
 
 
 Volleyball

Medal table
Final medal tally:

Medalists

Archery
Recurve

Compound

Athletics

Badminton

Baseball

Basketball

Bowling

Boxing

Canoeing

Cycling

Diving

Equestrian

Fencing
Men

Women

Football

Futsal

Golf

Gymnastics

Handball

Judo

Karate

Racquetball

Roller sports
Artistic skating

Speed skating

Rowing
Men

Women

Rugby sevens

Sailing

Shooting
Men

Women

Softball

Squash

Swimming
Men

Women

Mixed

Synchronized swimming

Table tennis

Taekwondo

Tennis

Triathlon

Volleyball

Water polo

Water skiing

Weightlifting

Wrestling

See also
 Pan American Games
 Central American and Caribbean Games
 Central American Games
 South American Games

References

 
Bolivarian Games
Bolivarian
Bolivarian Games
Bolivarian
Bolivarian
Multi-sport events in Colombia
Santa Marta
Bolivarian Games